Long Violent History is the fourth studio album by American country music singer Tyler Childers. It is an album centralized on the title track, a nod to the coal miners of the Appalachia Region of the United States. It’s based on the Coal Wars fought between coal miners and the U.S. Government.

Content
In September 2020, Childers announced the album's release via a video message posted on YouTube. In the six-minute video, Childers addresses the album's central themes in opposition of racism, especially when viewed from the perspective of "rural white" listeners. The album is mostly composed of fiddle songs, but ends on the title track, a protest song. According to NPR, Childers cited the Black Lives Matter movement, along with the Battle of Blair Mountain in 1921, as the two main influences of the album's themes.

Critical reception
Stephen Thomas Erlewine of AllMusic wrote that it was "the rare protest album that doesn't need words to shout, and it's all the more powerful because of it."

Track listing
All tracks public domain except "Long Violent History", written by Tyler Childers.
"Send In the Clowns" - 4:08
"Zollie's Retreat" - 2:25
"Squirrel Hunter" - 3:59
"Sludge River Stomp" - 4:38
"Midnight on the Water" - 4:08
"Camp Chase" - 3:54
"Jenny Lynn" - 3:10
"Bonaparte's Retreat" - 2:46 
"Long Violent History"	 - 3:10

Charts

References

2020 albums
Tyler Childers albums